The Roux family of Marseilles was a family of hydrographers and marine painters that specialized in ship portraits.  While many generations were involved in the hydrographic business, it was really only three generations who painted and became known for their skill and accuracy in portraying a ship, making their work seem more like a photograph than a painting.  The painters in the family were Joseph, Ange-Joseph Antoine, Mathieu-Antoine, Ursule-Josephine, François Joseph Frédéric and François Geoffroi.

Joseph Roux
Joseph Roux was born in 1725 in Marseille, France to Joseph Roux, who worked as a hydrographer, and Magdaleine Senequier.  He took over the family business and became a hydrographer like his father, “in the course of which he published, manufactured, and sold a wide assortment of charts, navigating instruments, and related nautical gear.”  It was probably around the mid-18th century when Joseph earned the title of “Hydrographe du Roi” meaning Hydrographer to the King.  In 1764, Joseph published a folio of twelve Mediterranean charts which were used for a number of years after their publication.  Copies were even used on HMS Victory in 1803 and 1805, as well as on HMS Shannon.  Joseph was also known to paint, though not as frequently as his son or grandchildren.  Two such works, oil paintings titled Bonhomme Richard vs Serapis and Naval Engagement between a British East Indiaman and a French Warship, exist at the Peabody Essex Museum and showcase Joseph's skill as a painter.  Joseph died in 1793 in Marseille.

Ange-Joseph Antoine Roux
Ange-Joseph Antoine Roux, who went by “Antoine Roux”, was born March 5, 1765, in Marseille, France to Joseph Roux and Marie-Ursule Demoline.  He grew up in his father's hydrographic shop where he most likely picked up a great deal of nautical knowledge.  The earliest known work by Antoine is a sketch from 1787, signed and dated, showing pieces of a man-of-war.  Later sketchbooks are in the collection at the Peabody Essex Museum. Antoine became famous for his ship portraits and shipowners and captains were eager to entrust him with the task of creating paintings for their ships.  He became very popular for the accuracy in his ship portraits and the way he made them seem alive.

For the most part Antoine's style remained the same, especially when it came to hulls and rigging, which he depicted with excellent skill.  One area that changed was his depiction of water.  It was around 1805-1806 that he stopped illustrating waves so formally with high-crested wavelets, except in the instance of rough seas, and replaced them with softer and more natural looking waves.  There was also a discernible pattern in regards to his signature:

1790s-1802     “fait par Ante [or “Antne”] Roux"

1801-1830     “Ante [or “Antne”] Roux à Marseille"

1825-1835     “Ante [or Antne”] Roux père à Marseille"

Antoine died April 20, 1835, from Cholera.  He continued to paint and work in the hydrographic shop up until his death.

Mathieu-Antoine Roux
Mathieu-Antoine Roux, who like his father went by “Antoine Roux”, was born in Marseille, France on May 20, 1799, to the elder Antoine and Rose Elizabeth Gabrielle Catelin.  He would be the first of four children to the couple.  Antoine also became a painter, although he is not considered to be quite as skilled as his brothers or father were.  He ended up taking over the hydrographic business of an uncle only a short distance from the one his father ran.  He used the same image his grandfather had introduced in his hydrographic shop and that became associated with the Roux family, that of the two little men, one using a telescope and the other using an octant.  Upon Antoine's death on January 26, 1872, his son François Antoine Roux, nicknamed “Tonin”, took over the hydrographic shop.  To distinguish his paintings from those of his father, Antoine's signatures were very clear.  He often signed “Ante Roux fils ainé”, which can be translated as “Antoine Roux eldest son”.

Ursule-Josephine Roux
Ursule Josephine was the second child of Antoine and Rose; born in 1801 in Marseille.  Very little is known about her and she did not paint nearly as frequently as her brothers.  One painting, titled View of Marseille Harbor is owned by the Peabody Essex Museum.  As of 1924, two others were privately owned by a gentleman named Edouard Gaubert, who knew the family.  They are titled L’Entrée du Port de Marseille and La Calanque de l’Ourse.

François Joseph Frédéric Roux
François Joseph Frédéric, who went by Frédéric, was the third child of Antoine and Rose and was born in 1805 in Marseille.  Frédéric was already painting for money at the age of 17 in 1822, clearly showing a great skill for his craft.  As a young man, Frédéric went to Paris at the insistence of Carle and Horace Vernet (son and grandson of Joseph Vernet) to study at the Vernet studio.  It was in Paris where he was commissioned by Admiral Jean-Baptiste Philibert Wilaumez to create 40 watercolors of the vessels on which he had served or been involved with.  This set is now in the Musée de la Marine in Paris.  Frédéric was also commissioned to make 23 watercolors dedicated to the Duc d’Orléans, Ferdinand Philippe, which were finished in 1831. It was around 1835 that Frédéric moved from Paris to Havre where he set up a hydrographic shop and painting business.

Frédéric did not solely devote himself to the hydrographic and painting business, but instead divided his time with adventures, traveling and generally enjoying the pleasures life had to offer.  He ventured a few times back to Marseilles, but spent the rest of his life in Havre, where he died in January 1870.

François Geoffroi Roux
François Geoffroi, who went by François, was the fourth child of Antoine and Rose and was born on October 21, 1811, in Marseille.  His talent brought him the attention of Carle and Horace Vernet, as it had his brother Frédéric, but he did not leave for Paris as his brother did.  He stayed in Marseille where he eventually took over his father's hydrographic shop.  François became famous for his skill in portraying a ship naturally, to almost make it appear as though one were looking at a photograph of a ship rather than a painting.  He was so skilled that it was said that François had “assimilated the science of the ship as if he were both builder and sailor.”  Of particular interest was a series of watercolors he created between the late 1860s and 1882 that illustrated the “development of naval and merchant vessels since the last decade of the eighteenth century.”  These were given to the Louvre, but not all made it and so an exact count of how many were created is unknown.  The Musée de la Marine currently owns 71.  François died in Marseille on September 30, 1882.

Exhibitions
July 1 – September 15, 1939 at the Penobscot Marine Museum in Searsport, Maine.  87 watercolors were on display at this exhibition.
1955 at the Musée Cantini in Marseille, France where 80 watercolors and some sketchbooks were displayed.
1978-1979 at the Peabody Essex Museum in Salem, Massachusetts.

Family tree
The following is the family tree for the Roux family of Marseilles.

References

Bibliography
Smith, P. C. F. (1978).  The Artful Roux:  Marine Painters of Marseille.  Salem, MA: Peabody Museum of Salem.
Johnson, A. (Ed.). (1925).  Ships and Shipping:  A Collection of Pictures Including Many American Vessels Painted by Antoine Roux and his Sons.  Salem, MA: Marine Research Society.
The Penobscot Marine Museum (1939).  A Catalogue of a Loan Exhibition of Ship Portraits by the Roux Family of Marseilles.  Searsport, ME: The Penobscot Marine Museum.
Gulliver, L. J. (1930).  Ship Portraits by Antoine Roux and Sons.  U.S. Naval Institute Proceedings, v. 56(no.1), pp. 121–122.

Further reading
Meissonnier, J. (Ed.). (1968).  Sailing Ships of the Romantic Era:  A 19th Century Album of Water Colours by Antoine Roux.  Switzerland:  Edita Lausanne.

External links
The Mariners' Museum
 Peabody Essex Museum
The Louvre
Philadelphia Museum of Art
Musée National de la Marine
Penobscot Marine Museum

French marine artists
Marseille-related lists